The 2015–16 Damehåndboldligaen (known as the Primo Tours Ligaen for sponsorship reasons) was the 80th season of the Damehåndboldligaen, Denmark's premier Handball league.

Team information 
Skive fH was originally going to play in the league in the 2015-16 season but the club's economy forced them to withdraw and their place was offered to Nykøbing Falster Håndboldklub instead.

Regular season

Standings

Results

Top Goalscorer – Regular Season

Championship playoffs

Quarterfinal

Semifinal

Bronze Match

Final

Relegation playoff

Group 1

Group 2

All Star Team
Goalkeeper:  Silje Solberg (TTH)
Left Wing:  Ann Grete Nørgaard (VHK)
Left Back:  Trine Troelsen (SIL)
Centre Back:  Kristina Kristiansen (NFH)
Pivot:  Mette Gravholt (NFH)
Right Back:  Nathalie Hagman (TTH)
Right Wing:  Lina Rask (AAR)

Top goalscorers

References

External links
 Danish Handball Federaration 

2015–16 domestic handball leagues
Handboldligaen
Handboldligaen